MORC family CW-type zinc finger 1 is a protein that in humans is encoded by the MORC1 gene.

Function

This gene encodes the human homolog of mouse morc and like the mouse protein it is testis-specific. Mouse studies support a testis-specific function since only male knockout mice are infertile; infertility is the only apparent defect. These studies further support a role for this protein early in spermatogenesis, possibly by affecting entry into apoptosis because testis from knockout mice show greatly increased numbers of apoptotic cells. [provided by RefSeq, Jan 2009].

References

Further reading